El Gaada is a town and commune in Mascara Province, Algeria. According to the 1998 census it has a population of 4,119. Among the major families of the city, Al-Mahaja which are the progeny of Al-Shorafa.

References

Communes of Mascara Province
Mascara Province